The New Economics Foundation (NEF) is a British think-tank that promotes "social, economic and environmental justice".

NEF was founded in 1986 by the leaders of The Other Economic Summit (TOES) with the aim of working for a "new model of wealth creation, based on equality, diversity and economic stability".

The foundation has 50 staff in London and is active at a range of different levels.  Its programmes include work on well-being, its own kinds of measurement and evaluation, sustainable local regeneration, its own forms of finance and business models, sustainable public services, and the economics of climate change.

Work 
The Foundation works in the areas of community development, democracy, and economics. The foundation's work on sustainability indicators, which measures aspects of life and environment, indicated the connection between economic growth and sustainability.

From 1995 to 2000, the Foundation made social audits of companies to measure and evaluate a company's social and ethical performance according to its standards. This work was instrumental in the formation of the Institute of Social and Ethical Accountability to promote professional standards around social accounting and auditing. NEF supported the National Programme for Third Sector Commissioning with research and reporting on "how best the Third Sector could evidence its wider impact on public services and their delivery", which underpinned the Office of the Third Sector's work programme on third sector commissioning from 2009.

Jubilee 2000 campaign 

The Jubilee 2000 campaign, strategised for and run by NEF, collected 24 million signatures for its worldwide petition on development and poverty.

Local Money Flows 
NEF has also developed a Local Money Flows measurement programme, which enables communities to monitor and map how money flows through the local economy.

Happy Planet Index 

In July 2006, the Foundation launched the Happy Planet Index, intended to challenge existing indices of a state's success, such as Gross Domestic Product (GDP) and Human Development Index (HDI). 

NEF was awarded the International Society for Quality-of-Life Studies' Award for the Betterment of the Human Condition in 2007, in recognition of its work on the Happy Planet Index.

21-hour working week 
In February 2010 the New Economics Foundation called for gradual transition to a working week of 21 hours.

History 
James Robertson, a British economist, and Alison Pritchard, a Schumacher Society Council member, helped to set up The Other Economic Summit (TOES) and NEF. Ed Mayo was Chief Executive from 1992 until 2003. The current chief executive is Miatta Fahnbulleh who succeeded Marc Stears in November 2017.

The organisation has launched a range of new organisations to promote its ideas, including the Ethical Trading Initiative, AccountAbility, Time Banking UK, London Rebuilding Society, the Community Development Finance Association, and others.

The organisation's current projects include work on community-based housing, worker organising in the digital economy, restoring local banking and challenging xenophobia and racism in the Brexit debate. It is also active in community economic regeneration. The Foundation's BizFizz programme, an entrepreneurship development programme, has created more than 900 new businesses in deprived areas. The organisation has now taken this and Local Alchemy to six other countries through its international programme.

The Foundation's public events attract well-known speakers. Its clone town campaign in favour of local economic diversity was covered two years running by every major national newspaper and TV news station and it was taken up in the Save Our Small Shops Campaign in the Evening Standard.

Funding 
NEF is a registered charity and is funded by individual supporters, public finance businesses and international grant-giving bodies.

The New Economics Foundation has been rated as 'broadly transparent' in its funding by Transparify and has been given an A grade for funding transparency by Who Funds You?

Publications 
 Public services and (in)equality in an age of austerity. Joe Penny (July 2013).
 Where does money come from?. Andrew Jackson, Richard Werner, Tony Greenham and Josh Ryan-Collins (12 December 2012)
 Growth isn't Possible: Why rich countries need a new economic direction. Andrew Simms, Dr Victoria Johnson, Peter Chowla (25 January 2010).
 21 hours: Why a shorter working week can help us all to flourish in the 21st century. Anna Coote, Andrew Simms and Jane Franklin (13 February 2010).
 The Great Transition. Josh Ryan-Collins (18 October 2009).
 The Consumption Explosion. Andrew Simms, Victoria Johnson, Joe Smith and Susanna Mitchell (24 September 2009).
 The Happy Planet Index: An index of human well-being and environmental impact. Nic Marks, Saamah Abdallah, Andrew Simms and Sam Thompson (12 July 2006).
 Clone Town Britain: The survey results on the bland state of the nation. Andrew Simms, Petra Kjell and Ruth Potts (6 June 2005).

See also 
 A Green New Deal
 Coproduction of public services by service users and communities
 Great Transition
 List of UK think tanks
 New Economy Coalition – sister organisation in America
 New Economy movement
 Open Source Ecology
 Schumacher Circle organisations
 Transition town

References

External links 
 
 "New Economics Foundation". The Philanthropy Atlas. The Institute for Philanthropy.
 "New Index (Inner City 100) will Reward Inner City Innovations". University of Sheffield.
 The Happy Planet Index.
 One hundred months.
 Citizens Advice Appointment.

Political and economic think tanks based in the United Kingdom
Social economy in the United Kingdom
Sustainability organizations
Political and economic research foundations